The freckled darter (Percina lenticula) is a species of freshwater ray-finned fish, a darter from the subfamily Etheostomatinae, part of the family Percidae, which also contains the perches, ruffes and pikeperches. It is endemic to the United States.

Geographic distribution
They are found in the drainage systems of the Mobile Bay, Pascagoula, and Pearl Rivers in Georgia, Alabama, Mississippi and Louisiana.

References

Freshwater fish of the United States
Percina
Fish described in 1964
Taxonomy articles created by Polbot